Vijaya Gurunatha Sethupathi (born 16 January 1978), known professionally as Vijay Sethupathi, is an Indian actor and film producer who predominantly works in Tamil films. He is a recipient of several accolades including a National Film Award, two Filmfare Awards South and two Tamil Nadu State Film Awards.

Following a stint as an NRI accountant in Dubai, Sethupathi started his film career working as a background actor and played minor supporting roles before starring in his first lead role in Seenu Ramasamy's Thenmerku Paruvakaatru (2010). In 2012, he rose to massive popularity with critical and commercial successes in Sundarapandian (2012), Pizza (2012) and Naduvula Konjam Pakkatha Kaanom (2012).

Sethupathi has established himself as an actor with his notable work in Tamil films like Soodhu Kavvum  (2013), Idharkuthane Aasaipattai Balakumara (2013), Pannaiyarum Padminiyum (2014), Kadhalum Kadandhu Pogum (2016), Iraivi (2016), Vikram Vedha (2017), '96 (2018), Chekka Chivantha Vaanam (2018), Petta (2019), Super Deluxe (2019), Master (2021), Vikram (2022) and Telugu films like Sye Raa Narasimha Reddy (2019) and Uppena (2021) And he also worked in the popular web Series On Amazon prime Farzi (2023) .He is currently working in Jawan starring Shah Rukh Khan, Nayanthara, directed by Atlee and music by Anirudh Ravichander.

Early life
Vijay Sethupathi was born on 16 January 1978 and was raised in Rajapalayam until he moved to Chennai in class six. He lived in Ennore located in North Chennai. He attended the MGR Higher Secondary School in Kodambakkam and Little Angels Mat. Hr. Sec. School. According to Sethupathi, he was a "below-average student right from school" and was neither interested in sports nor extra-curricular activities. At age 16, he auditioned for a role in Nammavar (1994), but was rejected due to his short height.

Sethupathi did a series of odd jobs for pocket money: salesman at a retail store, cashier at a fast food joint and a phone booth operator. He graduated with a Bachelor of Commerce degree from the Dhanraj Baid Jain College (an affiliate of the University of Madras) in Thoraipakam. A week after he finished college, he joined as an account assistant at a wholesale cement business. He had to take care of three siblings and moved to Dubai, United Arab Emirates as an accountant because it paid him four times more than what he was making in India. While in Dubai, he met his future-wife, Jessie, online. The two dated, eventually marrying in 2003.

Unhappy with his job, he returned to India in 2003. After a brief stint in the interior decoration business with friends, he joined a marketing company that dealt with readymade kitchens when he saw Koothupattarai’s poster. He recalled director Balu Mahendra remarking that he had a "very photogenic face", and motivated him to pursue an acting career; however he never cast Sethupathi in his films.

Career

2006–2011
He subsequently joined the Chennai-based theatre group Koothu-P-Pattarai as an accountant and actor where he observed actors from close quarters. He made his beginnings as a background actor, particularly playing the role of the lead character's friend in a few films. He also acted in television series, including the well-known series Penn that began in March 2006, as well as several short films as part of the television show Nalaya Iyakunar for Kalaignar TV. He worked with Karthik Subbaraj on many short films, who later cast him in his first feature film, subsequently yield him the Best Actor award for one of his films at the Norway Tamil Film Festival short film competition.

Sethupathi accompanied a group of actors who went to director Selvaraghavan's studio to audition for his gangster film Pudhupettai (2006) and was selected to play Dhanush's friend in the film. Following Pudhupettai, he was associated with a Tamil-Kannada bilingual film called Akhaada. While he was selected to play the lead in the Tamil version, the director offered him the antagonistic role in its Kannada version. However, the film did not see a theatrical release. After making an appearance in Prabu Solomon's Lee (2007), he was cast by director Suseenthiran in minor supporting roles in his first two projects, Vennila Kabadi Kuzhu (2009) and Naan Mahaan Alla (2010). Sethupathi would later credit Suseenthiran with having had an "important role in helping him realise his dreams". Director Seenu Ramasamy identified Sethupathi's talent during the audition of his film and Sethupathi landed his first lead role in Ramasamy's drama film Thenmerku Paruvakaatru (2011), in which he portrayed a shepherd, the film went on to win three National Film Awards including the prize for the Best Tamil Feature Film of that year.

2012–2013
2012 marked a turning point in Sethupathi's career; all his three releases were critical and commercial successes, resulting in a rise in his popularity. He was first seen in a negative role in Sundarapandian which featured M. Sasikumar in the lead role, and then played the lead roles in the directorial debuts of Karthik Subbaraj and Balaji Tharaneetharan, the thriller film Pizza and the comedy entertainer Naduvula Konjam Pakkatha Kaanom, respectively. He enacted the role of Michael, a delivery boy in the former and a young man named Prem who sustains short-term memory loss two days before his marriage in the latter, with his performance in both films being praised by critics. Malini Mannath from The New Indian Express in her review of Pizza wrote: "Sethupathy, a delight to watch, carries the entire film on his shoulders. His voice perfectly modulated, he proves his versatility and acumen to handle any role. Michael’s nightmarish experience, and his fear and horror when he’s trapped in the mansion, is perfectly conveyed by the actor". His performance in Pizza earned him his first nomination for the Filmfare Award for Best Actor – Tamil. With regard to Naduvula Konjam Pakkatha Kaanom, The Times of India reviewer M. Suganth cited that Sethupathi "continues his superb show from Pizza conveying Prem's peculiar condition with vacant stares and amusing pauses between his lines", further noting: "That he never makes the character's repetitive dialogues irritating is a proof of his terrific timing". According to a survey published by BBC Tamil, Pizza and Naduvula Konjam Pakkatha Kaanom claimed the first two spots in list of Best Films, and both films competed at the 2013 Norway Tamil Film Festival, while Sethupathi won two awards, one for each film, at the Edison Awards and the Big FM Tamil Entertainment Awards.

By the end of the year, Indiaglitz.com named Sethupathi as one of 2012's best Tamil actors, and called him "the rising star of Kollywood". whilst film critic Baradwaj Rangan stated that Sethupathi had become "[...] sort of [an] indie-film star, the first ever in Tamil cinema".

In 2013, he was first seen in the crime comedy Soodhu Kavvum that saw him playing the role of a forty-year-old kidnapper. The film opened to extremely positive reviews and has become a huge success at the box office. Malini Mannath from The New Indian Express in her review wrote: "It’s laudable that the actor doesn’t hesitate to take a role that has him playing a 40-year-old man, greying and with a paunch". The Times of India reviewer N. Venkateswaran cited that "His knack of choosing good roles and working with new directors brimming with ideas will stand him in good stead, as also the work he puts in to portray each character. He put on weight and grew a beard to play Das, and the look fits him to a 'T'". His next release was Idharkuthane Aasaipattai Balakumara, directed by Gokul. It was met with positive reviews by critics and Vijay Sethupathi's performance was highly praised. Haricharan Pudipeddi from The New Indian Express in his review wrote : "Vijay Sethupathi has become a darling of the masses. Scene after scene, the audience hoots and cheers for him in unison." Rediff reviewer S.Saraswathi cited that "His greatest strength lies in being able to counter the stereotypical image of heroes in commercial cinema today.  In every film, we see him in a completely different avatar, and his latest film is no different. Vijay Sethupathi seems to have the knack of choosing the right role and script and he effortlessly slips into his character as Kumar." Behindwoods stated that Sethupathi "has done it yet again, raising his pennant higher, making himself more visible to his fervent fans. The depth in his innocence and the foolhardiness in his love are a couple of things that stand tall in the character he plays, and Vijay Sethupathi has pulled it off in grand style.".

2014–2015

In 2014, his films Rummy and Pannaiyarum Padminiyum were released, both directed by debutants. Pannaiyarum Padminiyum, based on its same-titled short film, revolved around an old man and his vintage car Premier Padmini, with Sethupathi starring as its chauffeur. The film opened to predominantly positive reviews from critics and is the only Tamil film which has been selected to be screened at the 19th International Film Festival of Kerala. The same year Akhaada resurfaced in the media as it was being dubbed into Tamil as Edakku by its makers, to profit from Sethupathi's popularity in Tamil Nadu. The film was being promoted as a Sethupathi film, with the actor being prominently featured in the posters, although he had only a minor role in it, and Sethupathi stated that the audience would feel cheated after seeing the film, if it was promoted this way. He was next seen in the action drama Vanmam directed by debutant Jaikrishna. Though the film was met with average reviews, Sethupathi's performance was praised by critics. Malini Mannath from The New Indian Express in his review wrote : It's Vijay Sethupathi's film the whole way. The actor renders a power packed performance, capturing each nuance of the character with precision and understanding. Behindwoods stated that the stand out element in the film is Vijay Sethupathi, who has managed to attach his performance to the nativity of the location to the best of his ability. The actor scores effortlessly in some portions, one of them being the scene where he breaks into Kreshna's house under the influence of alcohol.

In 2015, he was first seen in the political thriller Purampokku Engira Podhuvudamai directed by S. P. Jananathan. It was met with positive reviews by critics and Sethupathi's performance was highly praised. The Times of India reviewer M. Suganth cited that "Vijay Sethupathi redeems everything with a sensitive performance.Balusamy might be the film's central character, but it is Yamalingam who is its beating heart." Rediff reviewer S.Saraswathi cited that "Vijay Sethupathi, as a tormented soul loath to pull the lever that will release the trapdoor and take a life, is perhaps the best." In July 2015, his first movie as producer Orange Mittai directed by Biju Viswanath got released and met with positive reviews by the critics and entertainment portals. He was next seen in the rom-com Naanum Rowdy Dhaan directed by Vignesh Shivan which became his highest-grossing movie until date.

2016–present
In 2016, he was first seen in the police action thriller Sethupathi directed by S. U. Arunkumar. Sethupathi received praise for his performance. Vishal Menon of The Hindu said that it was a good thriller and a better family drama. Latha Srinivasan of DNA wrote that there were no loud over-the-top dialogues and punchlines that were typical of all on-screen cops in Tamil films and Vijay Sethupathi outshone many other Kollywood heroes as the cop. Malini Mannath of The New Indian Express wrote that, "It is another feather in the cap for Vijay Sethupathi, who is revealing his versatility yet again as he handles his role with remarkable understanding." Anupama Subramaniam of Deccan Chronicle wrote that, "Sethupathi’s moves are full of energy and enthusiasm and his impeccable dialogue delivery is a treat to watch." He was next seen in the romantic comedy Kadhalum Kadandhu Pogum by Nalan Kumaraswamy. His next release was Iraivi followed by Dharma Durai by Seenu Ramasamy, Aandavan Kattalai and Rekka. He was nicknamed Makkal Selvan ( people's man) by Seenu Ramasamy while filming Dharma Durai, and has been popularly known by that since. His next release was the long delayed mystery-thriller Puriyatha Puthir. Then, he appeared in the rural drama Karuppan directed by R. Panneerselvam. In 2017, he appeared in the neo-noir action thriller film Vikram Vedha in the lead role alongside Madhavan, which earned him his first Filmfare Award for Best Actor – Tamil.

In 2018, his first release was Oru Nalla Naal Paathu Solren directed by Arumugakumar. Then, he acted in the action comedy Junga which was directed by Gokul and was produced by Sethupathi. He then appeared in Mani Ratnam's multi-starrer Chekka Chivantha Vaanam. He then starred in C. Prem Kumar's romantic drama '96 alongside Trisha which released a week after the release of Chekka Chivantha Vaanam. '96 earned him his second Filmfare Award for Best Actor – Tamil. He then acted in the Balaji Tharaneetharan-directorial Seethakaathi, Thiagarajan Kumararaja's Super Deluxe and has acted in a negative role in Karthik Subbaraj's Petta alongside Rajinikanth. During the second half of 2019, he made his Malayalam and Telugu debuts with Maarconi Mathaai and Sye Raa Narasimha Reddy, respectively.

In 2019, Film Companion ranked Sethupathi's performance in Aandavan Kattalai and Super Deluxe among the 100 Greatest Performances of the Decade. His performance in the latter won him the National Film Award for Best Supporting Actor. In 2020, he starred in Ka Pae Ranasingam starring Aishwarya Rajesh. In October 2020, it was announced that Sethupathi would play the lead role of Sri Lankan cricketer Muttiah Muralitharan in the biopic titled 800. Sethupathi later announced that he was opting out of the film on Muralitharan's request after political controversy regarding the role.

In 2021, Sethupathi appeared in Lokesh Kanagaraj's film Master alongside Vijay. He then appeared in the Telugu film Uppena, which was written and directed by Bucchi Babu Sana. After Uppena, Sethupathi appeared in three films in the month of September in 2021, Laabam, Tughlaq Durbar and Annabelle Sethupathi. He appeared in Mughizh in which his daughter makes her debut. Sethupathi is also starring in Vetrimaaran's Tamil film Viduthalai.

As of October 2021 he is the host of MasterChef India – Tamil, which started on 7 August 2021 on Sun TV Network.

In 2022, Vijay Sethupathi appeared in the drama film Kadaisi Vivasayi directed by M. Manikandan. Following, the romantic comedy Vignesh Shivan's Kaathuvaakula Rendu Kaadhal with Nayanthara and Samantha. After Master, Vijay Sethupathi again got a villain role in Lokesh Kanagaraj directorial Vikram starring Kamal Haasan in the lead role. Vijay Sethupathi played a drug dealer, and his impressive body language and extraordinary performance left the audience stunned. Vikram has broken several box office records and has officially become one of the highest grossing films in Tamil Nadu. Vijay Sethupathi and his mentor Seenu Ramasamy have combined for the fourth time to deliver the family emotion packed Maamanithan. Vijay Sethupathi acted in Malayalam movie 19(1)(a) starring with Nithya Menen and was released by streaming platform Disney+ Hotstar. In December, his action comedy DSP was released to negative reviews.

Social work
In 2014, Chennai Mayopathy Institute of Muscular Dystrophy and Research Center organized a rally on 3 August at Marina Beach to raise awareness on Muscular Dystrophy. Sethupathi has taken part in the rally along with actresses Gayathrie and Varalaxmi Sarathkumar. Sethupathi met Chief minister of Tamil Nadu M.K Stalin on 15 June 2021 and donated ₹25 lakhs as part of the Corona relief fund.

Personal life
Sethupathi has three siblings, one elder brother, one younger brother and one younger sister. He returned from Dubai in 2003 to marry his girlfriend, Jessie, whom he had met and dated online. They have two children, a son Surya and a daughter Shreeja. He named his son Surya in the remembrance of his friend who died during his school days. Surya made his acting debut playing the younger version of Sethupathi in Naanum Rowdy Dhaan (2015). Surya appeared with his father again in Sindhubaadh (2019).

Filmography

Accolades

References

External links

 

Tamil male actors
Indian male film actors
Living people
Male actors in Tamil cinema
Male actors from Chennai
People from Virudhunagar district
1978 births
Best Supporting Actor National Film Award winners
Filmfare Awards South winners
Indian atheists
Male actors in Telugu cinema